Helicoprion is an extinct genus of shark-like eugeneodont fish. Almost all fossil specimens are of spirally arranged clusters of the individuals' teeth, called "tooth whorls", which in life were embedded in the lower jaw. As with most extinct cartilaginous fish, the skeleton is mostly unknown. Fossils of Helicoprion are known from a 20 million year timespan during the Permian period from the Artinskian stage of the Cisuralian (Early Permian) to the Roadian stage of the Guadalupian (Middle Permian). The closest living relatives of Helicoprion (and other eugeneodonts) are the chimaeras, though their relationship is very distant. The unusual tooth arrangement is thought to have been an adaption for feeding on soft bodied prey, and may have functioned as a deshelling mechanism for hard bodied cephalopods such as nautiloids and ammonoids. In 2013, systematic revision of Helicoprion via morphometric analysis of the tooth whorls found only H. davisii, H. bessonowi and H. ergassaminon to be valid, with some of the larger tooth whorls being outliers.

Fossils of Helicoprion have been found worldwide, as the genus is known from Russia, Western Australia, China, Kazakhstan, Japan, Laos, Norway, Canada, Mexico, and the United States (Idaho, Nevada, Wyoming, Texas, Utah, and California). More than 50% of the fossils referred to Helicoprion are H. davisii specimens from the Phosphoria Formation of Idaho. An additional 25% of fossils are found in the Ural Mountains of Russia, belonging to the species H. bessonowi.

Description 

Like other chondrichthyan fish, Helicoprion and other eugeneodonts had skeletons made of cartilage. As a result, the entire body disintegrated once it began to decay, unless preserved by exceptional circumstances. This can make it difficult to draw precise conclusions on the full body appearance of Helicoprion. However, the body shape can be estimated via postcranial remains known from a few eugeneodonts. Eugeneodonts with preserved postcrania include the Pennsylvanian to Triassic-age caseodontoids Caseodus, Fadenia, and Romerodus.

These taxa have a fusiform (streamlined, torpedo-shaped) body plan, with triangular pectoral fins. There is a single large and triangular dorsal fin without a fin spine, and a tall, forked caudal fin which externally appears to be homocercal (with two equally-sized lobes). This general body plan is shared by active, open-water predatory fish such as tuna, swordfish, and lamnid sharks. Eugeneodonts also lack pelvic and anal fins, and judging by Romerodus, they would have had broad keels along the side of the body up to the caudal fin. Fadenia had five well-exposed gill slits, possibly with a vestigial sixth gill. There is no evidence of the specialized gill basket and fleshy operculum present in living chimaeroids. Based on the proportional size of caseodontoid tooth whorls, Lebedev suggested that Helicoprion individuals with tooth whorls reaching  in diameter could reach  in length, rivaling the size of modern basking sharks.

Tooth whorls 

Almost all Helicoprion specimens are known solely from "tooth whorls", which consist of dozens of enameloid covered teeth embedded within a common logarithmic spiral-shaped root. The youngest and first tooth at the center of the spiral, referred to as the "juvenile tooth arch", is hooked, but all other teeth are generally triangular in shape, laterally compressed and often serrated. Tooth size increases away from the center of the spiral (abaxial), with the largest teeth possibly exceeding  in length. The lower part of the teeth form projections that are shingled below the crown of the previous tooth. The lowest portion of the root below the enameloid tooth projections is referred to as the "shaft", and lies on cartilage that encapsulates the previous revolutions of the whorl. In a complete tooth whorl, the outermost part of the spiral terminates with an extended root that lacks the middle and upper portions of the tooth crown.

Cartilaginous skull 

Helicoprion specimens preserving more than tooth whorls are very rare. The best-preserved specimen of Helicoprion is IMNH 37899 (also known as "Idaho 4"), referred to Helicoprion davisii. It was found in Idaho in 1950 and was originally described in 1966 by Svend Erik Bendix-Almgreen. A 2013 redescription by Tapanila and colleagues was accompanied by CT scanning, in order to reveal the cartilaginous remains in more detail. CT scanning revealed a nearly complete jaw apparatus, articulated in a closed position with three-dimensional preservation. Alongside the tooth whorl, the specimen preserves a palatoquadrate (forming the upper jaw), Meckel's cartilage (forming the lower jaw), and a robust labial cartilage bracing the tooth whorl. All of these structures are composed of prismatic calcified cartilage, as with modern chondrichthyans. The specimen did not preserve a chondrocranium, the cartilaginous structure which would have housed the brain and sensory organs. The jaws are extensively laterally compressed (narrow) compared to living chondrichthyans, though this may at least partially be an artifact of post-mortem compression.

Helicoprion had an autodiastylic jaw suspension, meaning that the inner edge of the palatoquadrate was firmly attached (but not fused) to the chondrocranium at two separate points. These two attachment points are the dome-shaped ethmoid process at the front of the palatoquadrate, and the flange-like basal process at its upper rear corner. Autodiastylic jaws are common in early euchondrocephalans, though in modern animals they can only be found in embryonic chimaeriforms. Another well-preserved specimen, USNM 22577+494391 (the "Sweetwood specimen"), has demonstrated that the inner surface of the palatoquadrate was covered with numerous small (~2 mm wide) teeth. The palatoquadrate teeth were low and rounded, forming a "pavement" which scraped against the tooth whorl. When seen from behind, the palatoquadrate forms a paired jaw joint with the Meckel's cartilage. There is no evidence for an articulation between the palatoquadrate and the hyomandibula.

Meckel's cartilage has an additional projection right before the joint with the palatoquadrate. This extra process, unique to Helicoprion, likely served to limit jaw closure to prevent the whorl from puncturing the chondrocranium. Another unique characteristic of Helicoprion is that the preserved labial cartilage forms a synchondrosis (fused joint) with the upper surface of the Meckel's cartilage. This joint is facilitated via a long facet on the upper edge of Meckel's cartilage. The labial cartilage provides lateral support for the tooth whorl, widening near the root of each volution. By wedging into the palatoquadrate while the mouth is closed, the upper edge of the labial cartilage helps to spread out the forces used to limit the extent of the jaw closure. The rear portion of the labial cartilage has a cup-like form, protecting the developing root of the last and youngest volution.

Scales 
Tooth-like chondricthyan scales, specifically known as odontodes, have been found associated with H. bessonowi remains in Kazakhstan. They are broadly similar to scales of other eugeneodonts such as Sarcoprion and Ornithoprion. The scales have a cap-shaped base with a concave lower surface. The crowns are conical and covered with serrated longitudinal ridges. The scales may be monodontode (with one crown per base) or polyodontode (with a bundle of multiple crowns resulting from the fusion of several odontodes into a larger structure). Compared to other eugeneodonts, the scales of Helicoprion are more strongly pointed.

Paleobiology 

The unusual saw-like tooth whorl and the lack of wear on the teeth of Helicoprion implies a diet of soft bodied prey, as hard shelled prey would simply slip out of the mouth. Due to the narrow nature of the jaw, suction feeding is unlikely to have been effective, and Helicoprion is thought to have been a bite feeder. Biomechanical modelling by Ramsay et al. (2015) suggests that the teeth in the whorl had distinct functions depending on where they were in the spiral. The frontmost teeth served to snag and pull prey further into the mouth, while the middle teeth spear and the hind teeth served to puncture and bring prey further into the throat, with the prey being squeezed between the whorl and the two halves of the palatoquadrate. The labial cartilage served to buttress and provide support to the whorl.
Helicoprion may have started with a large gape during initial prey capture, followed by smaller jaw opening and closing cycles to further transport prey into the mouth, as is done by modern bite-feeding sharks. While modern sharks shake their heads from side to side to facilitate sawing and cutting their prey, the teeth of Helicoprion would likely further cut the prey during the jaw opening, due to the arc-like path of the front teeth, similar to the slashing motion of a knife. Helicoprion likely used a series of rapid, forceful jaw closures to initially capture and push prey deeper into the oral cavity, followed by cyclic opening and closing of the jaw to facilitate sawing through prey.

Ramsay and colleagues further suggested that the whorl could have served as an effective mechanism for deshelling hard-shelled cephalopods such as ammonoids and nautiloids, which were abundant in Early Permian oceans. If a hard-shelled cephalopod was bitten head-on, it was possible that the whorl could have served to pull the soft body out of the shell and into the mouth. During jaw closure, the palatoquadrates and tooth whorl combined to form a three-point system, equivalent to the set-up of an inverted three-point flexural test. This system was effective at trapping and holding soft parts to increase cutting efficiency and provide leverage against hard-shelled prey. This large bite force may have allowed Helicoprion to expand its diet to vertebrates, as its jaw apparatus was more than capable of cutting through skeletal elements of unarmoured bony fish and other chondrichthyans.

Classification 
Skull data from IMNH 37899 reveals several characteristics, such as an autodiastylic jaw suspension without an integrated hyomandibula, which confirm the placement of Helicoprion within the chondrichthyan subgroup Euchondrocephali. In contrast to their sister group Elasmobranchii (containing true sharks, rays, and kin), euchondrocephalans are primarily an extinct group. Living members of Euchondrocephali are solely represented by the order Chimaeriformes in the subclass Holocephali. Chimaeriforms, commonly known as chimaeras or ratfish, are a small and specialized group of rare deep-sea cartilaginous fish. The relationship between Helicoprion and living chimaeras is very distant, but had been previously suspected based on details of its tooth anatomy.

More specifically, Helicoprion can be characterized as a member of Eugeneodontida, an order of shark-like euchondrocephalans which lived from the Devonian to Triassic periods. Eugeneodonts have simple, autodiastylic skulls with reduced marginal dentition and enlarged whorls of blade-like symphysial teeth on the midline of the jaw. Within Eugeneodontida, Helicoprion is placed within Edestoidea, a group of eugeneodonts with particularly tall and angled symphysial teeth. Members of the Edestoidea are divided into two families based on the style of the dentition. One family, the Edestidae, has relatively short tooth blades with roots which incline backwards.

The other family, which contains Helicoprion, is sometimes called Agassizodontidae, based on the genus Agassizodus. However, other authors prefer the family name Helicoprionidae, which was first utilized 70 years prior to Agassizodontidae. Helicoprionids (or agassizodontids) have large, cartilage-supported whorls with strongly arched shapes. Helicoprionids do not shed their teeth; instead, their tooth whorls continually add new teeth with bases inclined forwards at the top of the whorl. As most eugeneodonts are based on fragmentary tooth remains, concrete phylogenetic relationships within the group remain unclear.

History and species
Three species of Helicoprion are currently considered valid via morphometric analyses, differing in the proportions of the upper, middle and lower sections of the tooth crown. These differences are only apparent in adult individuals past the 85th tooth of the spiral.

H. davisii and synonyms
The first specimen of Helicoprion to be described was WAMAG 9080, a 15-tooth fragment of a tooth whorl found along a tributary of the Gascoyne River in Western Australia. Henry Woodward described the fossil in 1886 and named it as the species Edestus davisii, commemorating the man who discovered it. Upon naming H. bessonowi in 1899, Alexander Karpinsky reassigned E. davisii to Helicoprion. In 1902, Charles R. Eastman referred H. davisii to his new genus Campyloprion, but this proposal was never widely accepted. Karpinsky's identification of Edestus davisii as a species of Helicoprion would eventually be upheld by Curt Teichert, who described several more complete tooth whorls from the Wandagee Formation of Western Australia in the late 1930s.

In 1907 and 1909, Oliver Perry Hay described a new genus and species of eugeneodont, Lissoprion ferrieri, from numerous fossils found in phosphate-rich Phosphoria Formation on the border between Idaho and Wyoming. He also synonymized H. davisii with his new genus and species. However, Karpinsky separated the two species once more and transferred them to Helicoprion in 1911. H. ferrieri was initially differentiated using the metrics of tooth angle and height, but Tapanila and Pruitt (2013) considered these characteristics to be intraspecifically variable. As a result, they reassigned H. ferrieri as a junior synonym of H. davisii. Outside the Phosphoria Formation, H. davisii specimens have also been found in Mexico, Texas, and Canada (Nunavut and Alberta). H. davisii is characterized by its tall and widely spaced tooth whorl, with these becoming more pronounced with age. The teeth also noticeably curve forwards.In a 1939 publication, Harry E. Wheeler described two new species of Helicoprion from California and Nevada. One of these, Helicoprion sierrensis, was described from a specimen (UNMMPC 1002) found in glacial moraine deposits in Eastern California, likely originating from the Goodhue Formation. Tapanila and Pruitt determined that the distinguishing shaft range of H. sierrensis was well within the variation found in H. davisii.

H. jingmenense was described in 2007 from a nearly complete tooth whorl (YIGM V 25147) with more than four volutions across a part and counterpart slab. It was discovered during the construction of a road passing through the Lower Permian Qixia Formation of Hubei Province, China. The specimen is very similar to H. ferrieri and H. bessonowi, though it differs from the former by having teeth with a wider cutting blade, and a shorter compound root, and differs from the latter by having fewer than 39 teeth per volution. Tapanila and Pruitt argued that the specimen was partially obscured by the surrounding matrix, resulting in an underestimation of tooth height. Taking into account intraspecific variation, they synonymized it with H. davisii.

H. bessonowi and synonyms
Helicoprion bessonowi was first described in an 1899 monograph by Alexander Karpinsky. Although it was not the first Helicoprion species to be described, it was the first known from complete tooth whorls, demonstrating that Helicoprion was distinct from Edestus. As a result, H. bessonowi serves as the type species for Helicoprion. H. bessonowi is primarily based on a number of specimens from Artinskian-age limestone of the Divya Formation, in the Ural Mountains of Russia. H. bessonowi specimens are also known from the Tanukihara Formation of Japan and Artinskian-age strata in Kazakhstan. It can be differentiated from other Helicoprion species by a short and narrowly spaced tooth whorl, backward-directed tooth tips, obtusely-angled tooth bases, and a consistently narrow whorl shaft.
One of two Helicoprion species described by Wheeler in 1939, H. nevadensis, is based on a single partial fossil found in a Nevadan mine by Elbert A. Stuart in 1929. This fossil, UNMMPC 1001, has been lost. It was reported as having originated from the Rochester Trachyte deposits, which Wheeler considered to be of Artinskian age. However, the Rochester Trachyte is in fact Triassic, and H. nevadensis likely did not originate in the Rochester Trachyte, thus rendering its true age unknown. Wheeler differentiated H. nevadensis from H. bessonowi by its pattern of whorl expansion and tooth height, but Leif Tapanila and Jesse Pruitt showed in 2013 that these were consistent with H. bessonowi at the developmental stage that the specimen represents.

Based on isolated teeth and partial whorls found on the island of Spitsbergen, Norway, H. svalis was described by Stanisław Siedlecki in 1970. The type specimen, a very large whorl with specimen number PMO A-33961, was noted for its narrow teeth that apparently are not in contact with each other. However, this seems to be a consequence of only the central part of the teeth being preserved, according to Tapanila and Pruitt. Since the whorl shaft is partially obscured, H. svalis cannot be definitely assigned to H. bessonowi, but it closely approaches the latter species in many aspects of its proportions.

H. ergassaminon

Like H. davisii, Helicoprion ergassaminon is known from the Phosphoria Formation of Idaho. However, it is comparatively much rarer. H. ergassimon was named and described in detail within a 1966 monograph by Svend Erik Bendix-Almgreen. The holotype specimen ("Idaho 5"), now lost, bore breakage and wear marks indicative of its usage in feeding. H. ergassimon is also represented by several other specimens from the Phosphoria Formation, though none of these show wear marks. This species is roughly intermediate between the two contrasting forms represented by H. bessonowi and H. davisii, having tall but narrowly-spaced teeth. Its teeth are also gently curved, with obtusely-angled tooth bases.

Other material
Several large whorls are difficult to assign to any particular species group, H. svalis among them. IMNH 14095, a specimen from Idaho, appears to be similar to H. bessonowi, but it has unique flange-like edges on the apices of its teeth. H. mexicanus, named by F.K.G. Müllerreid in 1945, was supposedly distinguished by its tooth ornamentation. Its holotype is currently missing, though its morphology was similar to that of IMNH 49382. In the absence of other material, it is currently a nomen dubium. Vladimir Obruchev described H. karpinskii from two teeth in 1953. He provided no distinguishing traits for this species, thus it must be regarded as a nomen nudum. Various other indeterminate Helicoprion specimens have been described from Canada, Japan, Laos, Idaho, Utah, Wyoming, and Nevada.

In 1922, Karpinsky named a new species of Helicoprion, H. ivanovi, from Gzhelian (latest Carboniferous) strata near Moscow. However, this species has subsequently been removed from Helicoprion and placed as a second species of the related eugeneodont Campyloprion.

Historical reconstructions

Earliest reconstructions 

Hypotheses for the placement and identity of Helicoprion's tooth whorls were controversial from the moment it was discovered. Woodward (1886), who referred the first known Helicoprion fossils to Edestus, discussed the various hypotheses concerning the nature of Edestus fossils.

Joseph Leidy, who originally described Edestus vorax, argued that they represented the jaws of "plagiostomous" (chondrichthyan) fish. William Davies agreed, specifically comparing it to the jaws of Janassa bituminosa, a Permian petalodont. On the other hand, J.S. Newberry suggested that the jaw-like fossils were defensive spines of a stringray-like fish. Woodward eventually settled on E.D. Cope's argument that they represented pectoral fin spines from fish similar to "Pelecopterus" (now known as Protosphyraena).

Karpinsky's 1899 monograph on Helicoprion noted that the bizarre nature of the tooth whorl made it difficult to reach precise conclusions on its function. He tentatively suggested that it curled up from the upper jaw for defensive or offensive purposes. This was justified by comparison to the upper tooth blades of Edestus, which by 1899 had been re-evaluated as structures belonging to the jaw.

Debates over the identity of Helicoprion's tooth whorl were abundant in the years following Karpinsky's monograph. In 1900, the publication was reviewed by Charles Eastman, who appreciated the paper as a whole but derided the sketch of the supposed life position of the whorl. Though Eastman admitted that the teeth of the whorl were very similar to those of other chondrichthyans, he still supported the idea that the whorl may have been a defensive structure embedded into the body of the animal, rather than the mouth. Shortly after his original monograph, Karpinsky published the argument that the whorl represented a curled, scute-covered tail akin to that of Hippocampus (seahorses). This proposal was immediately criticized by various researchers. E. Van den Broeck noted the fragility of the structure and argued that it was most well-protected as a paired feeding apparatus in the cheek of the animal. A.S. Woodward (unrelated to Henry Woodward) followed this suggestion with the hypothesis that each whorl represented a tooth battery from a gigantic shark. G. Simoens illustrated Karpinsky's various proposals and used histological data to adamantly argue that the whorls were toothed structures placed within the mouth. In 1911, Karpinsky illustrated the whorls as components of the dorsal fins. Reconstructions similar to those of Karpinsky (1899) were common in Russian publications as late as 2001.

Later reconstructions 
By the mid-20th century, the tooth whorl was generally accepted as positioned in the lower jaw of the animal. Though this general position was suspected almost immediately in the aftermath of Karpinsky's monograph, it was not illustrated as such until the mid-1900s. Around that time, an artist known only as "F. John" depicted Helicoprion within a set of "Tiere der Urwelt" trading cards. Their reconstruction presented the tooth whorl as an external structure curling down from the lower jaw of the animal. Similar downward-curling reconstructions have also been created by modern paleontologists and artists such as John A. Long, Todd Marshall and Karen Carr. The utility of the tooth whorl in this type of reconstruction was inferred based on sawfish, which incapacitate prey via lateral blows of their denticle-covered snouts.

Information on the position of eugeneodont tooth whorls was bolstered by two major publications in 1966. The first was Rainer Zangerl's description of a new Carboniferous eugeneodont, Ornithoprion. This taxon had a highly specialized skull with a small tooth whorl in a symphysial position, i.e. at the midline of the base of the lower jaw. Although skull material had also been reported for Sarcoprion and Fadenia at the time, Ornithoprion was the first eugeneodont to have its skull described in detail.

The other publication was Bendix-Almgreen's monograph on Helicoprion. His investigations reinterpreted the tooth-whorl as a symphyseal structure wedged between the meckelian cartilages, which were separated by a gap at the front. A pair of cartilage loops, the symphyseal crista, seems to develop as a paired extension of the jaw symphysis where the meckelian cartilages meet at the back of the jaw. Each loop arches up before curling back inwards, tracing over the root of the tooth whorl. The largest and youngest teeth form at the symphysis near the back of the jaw. Over time they are carried along the symphyseal crista, spiraling forwards, then downwards and inwards. The series of teeth accumulate into a spiraling structure, which is housed within the cavity defined by the symphyseal crista. The lateral and lower edges of the tooth whorl would have been obscured by skin during life. According to Bendix-Almgreen, the most likely use of the tooth whorl was as a tool for tearing and cutting prey against the upper jaw.

In the 1994 book Planet Ocean: A Story of Life, the Sea, and Dancing to the Fossil Record, author Brad Matsen and artist Ray Troll describe and depict a reconstruction based on the information gleaned by Bendix-Almgreen (1966). They proposed that no teeth were present in the animal's upper jaw, besides crushing teeth for the whorl to cut against. The two envisioned the living animal to have a long and very narrow skull, creating a long nose akin to the modern-day goblin shark. A 1996 textbook by Philippe Janvier presented a similar reconstruction, albeit with sharp teeth at the front of the upper jaw and rows of low crushing teeth in the back of the jaw.

In 2008, Mary Parrish created a new reconstruction for the renovated Ocean Hall at the Smithsonian Museum of Natural History. Designed under the direction of Robert Purdy, Victor Springer, and Matt Carrano, Parrish's reconstruction places the whorl deeper within the throat. This hypothesis was justified by the argument that the teeth supposedly had no wear marks, and the assumption that the whorl would have created a drag-inducing bulge on the chin of the animal if located in a symphysial position. They envisioned the tooth whorl as a structure derived from throat denticles and designed to assist swallowing. This would hypothetically negate the disadvantages the tooth whorl would produce if positioned further forward in the jaw. This reconstruction was criticized for the overly intricate and potentially ineffective design of such a structure, if solely used to assist swallowing.

Lebedev (2009) found more support for a reconstruction similar to those of Bendix-Almgreen (1966) and Troll (1994). A tooth whorl found in Kazakhstan preserved radial scratch marks; the whorl was also found near several wide tuberculated teeth similar to those of the putative caseodontoid Campodus. Lebedev's reconstruction presented a cartilage-protected tooth whorl in a symphysial position at the front of the long lower jaw. When the mouth was closed, the tooth whorl would fit into a deep longitudinal pocket on the upper jaw. Both the pocket in the upper jaw and the edges of the lower jaw would have been lined with dense rows of Campodus-like teeth. This was similar to the situation reported in related helicoprionids such as Sarcoprion and Agassizodus. As for Helicoprion's ecology, it was compared to modern cetaceans such as Physeter (the sperm whale), Kogia (dwarf and pygmy sperm whales), Grampus (Risso's dolphin), and Ziphius (Cuvier's beaked whale). These fish- and squid-eating mammals have reduced dentition, often restricted to the tip of the lower jaw. Lebedev's reconstruction approximates modern views on Helicoprion's anatomy, though the hypothetical long jaw and Campodus-like lateral dentition has been superseded by CT data.

References

External links

 
 

Agassizodontidae
Prehistoric cartilaginous fish genera
Cisuralian first appearances
Permian cartilaginous fish
Permian extinctions
Prehistoric fish of Australia
Permian fish of Asia
Prehistoric fish of Europe
Prehistoric fish of North America
Fossil taxa described in 1899
Fossils of the United States
Paleozoic life of Alberta
Paleozoic life of British Columbia
Paleozoic life of Nunavut